Lamentations (Live at Shepherds Bush Empire 2003) is a DVD of Opeth's first live video, released under the Music For Nations label in 2003. It was recorded at the Shepherd's Bush Empire on 25 September 2003.

Lamentations features Opeth playing the album Damnation in its entirety (with the song "Harvest" from Blackwater Park put in the running order before the last song), followed by some of the band's songs from Blackwater Park and Deliverance. The only song that was played from albums prior to Blackwater Park was "Demon of the Fall" (from the album My Arms, Your Hearse) as an encore song, but the song was not filmed for the DVD. Licensing issues with previous record labels prevented this from happening at the time of the disc's release.

The DVD also includes a documentary on the making of both Damnation and Deliverance because both albums were recorded at the same time.

This was the first Opeth release with Per Wiberg, although he did not become a permanent band member until Ghost Reveries.

A 2-disc CD version of the live recording was released in 2006 in a collector's edition slipcase.

A 3-disc vinyl version with new cover artwork was released in July, 2016.

DVD

CD track listing

Reception

The recording is generally regarded as having exceptionally clear and beautiful sound and visual quality, although Allmusic reviewer John Serba complained of the ubiquity of shots from what he termed the "Åkerfeldt Orifice Cam", showing close-ups of the singer's mouth and nose in excruciating detail.

Personnel

Opeth
 Mikael Åkerfeldt – vocals, guitar, songwriting (1–3, 5–14), music (4)
 Peter Lindgren – guitar
 Martin Lopez – drums
 Martín Méndez – bass

DVD & Album Production
Paul McLoone – production  
Benje Noble – 5.1 & Dts audio post production 
Louise Cassidy – production assisting
Andy Sneap – recording and mixing 
 Fredrik Odefjärd – editing, filming and production on Documentary

Imaging
Rigel Lastrella – DVD package design US artwork
Travis Smith – photography and artwork

Other personnel
 Per Wiberg – session keyboard and backing vocals 
 Steven Wilson – lyrics on "Death Whispered a Lullaby"

Show Production
Matt West – live sound engineering 
Steve Taylor – vision engineering  
Benny Trickett – vision mixing
Ben Gill – broadcast assisting  
Joe Dyer – director  
Liam Donoghue – project co-ordination

Tech
Drum
Damon Dougherty
Mole

Guitar
Coty Alinson

Lights
Mick Thornton – lighting design
Tellson James – lighting operation

Camera Crew
Assistants
Mark Cowley
Tony Lewis 

Operating 
Andy Pellet
Ben Grewin
Curtis Dunn
John Clarke
Martin Mathews
Samantha Dewhurst

Management
Guy Moore – contract management 
Gavin Bot – floor management 
Steve Waite – tour management

Agency
Tim Borror
Tobbe Lorentz

Running
Jane Costello
Jonathan Nicholas

Gripping
Neil Grey

Op Cable Rigging
Nigel Clarke
Zoran Trajkovic

References 

Opeth albums
2003 live albums
2003 video albums
Live video albums
Shepherd's Bush